Rivarolo del Re ed Uniti is a comune (municipality) in the Province of Cremona in the Italian region Lombardy, located about  southeast of Milan and about  southeast of Cremona.

Rivarolo del Re ed Uniti borders the following municipalities: Casalmaggiore, Casteldidone, Rivarolo Mantovano, Sabbioneta, Spineda.

References

Cities and towns in Lombardy